The current Minister for Heritage (New South Wales) is James Griffin. The actual title of Minister for Heritage was revived in 2021 having previously only been used for two separate periods, 1986-1988 and 2011-2019.

The NSW Heritage Act was introduced in 1977, along with the creation of the Heritage Council which informs its administration. The purpose of the act is to encourage the conservation of the State’s heritage, identify and protect items of significance, and to assist owners with the conservation of items of significance. The act is currently up for review, as it seen by the current administration as burdened by "costly regulatory obstacles".

Minister for Heritage 
 
The following individuals have been appointed Minister responsible for administering the NSW Heritage Act 1977.

References

New South Wales
Ministers of the New South Wales state government